Glenn William Tomalty (born July 23, 1954) is a Canadian retired professional ice hockey centre who played in one National Hockey League game for the Winnipeg Jets during the 1979–80 NHL season. His lone game came on November 7, 1979 against the Washington Capitals. The rest of his career, which lasted from 1977 to 1982, was spent in different minor leagues, with one final season playing in Belgium.

Tomalty was born in Lachute, Quebec.

Career statistics

Regular season and playoffs

See also
List of players who played only one game in the NHL

Notes

Bibliography

External links

1954 births
Canadian expatriate ice hockey players in the United States
Canadian ice hockey centres
Dayton Gems players
Fort Wayne Komets players
Grand Rapids Owls players
Ice hockey people from Quebec
Living people
People from Lachute
Tulsa Oilers (1964–1984) players
Undrafted National Hockey League players
Winnipeg Jets (1979–1996) players